The 2019 Basilicata regional election took place on 24 March 2019. The election was for all 20 members of the Regional Council of Basilicata, as well as for the President of the Region, who is also a member of the council. This election was the last one in Italy before the European election of 26 May 2019.

The original election date was 26 May 2019, but a snap election was called upon the resignation of the incumbent president Marcello Pittella, a member of the Democratic Party (PD), on 24 January 2019. After the subsequent dissolution of the Regional Council, Vice President Flavia Franconi (PD) became acting president.

The centre-left coalition had won each regional election in Basilicata since 1995 with a large margin. However, in the general election of 4 March 2018 both the centre-right coalition and the M5S substantially improved their performance: the center-right, for the first time, tied with the center-left (including LeU, which in 2018 was not a member of the coalition led by PD) and the M5S won about double the votes gained by the PD and LeU combined.

Electoral law
In addition to the newly elected president, the candidate for president of the coalition who ranks second automatically gains one seat (the first of his coalition or single party list), in the Regional Council, according to the Tatarella Law of 1995. The remaining 19 seats will be assigned on a province basis, proportionally with respect to the population of the provinces of Potenza and Matera.

The new electoral law follows proportional representation with a threshold of 3% for party lists and 4% for lists in coalitions that failed to reach the 8% threshold. If the first coalition wins 30% of the vote, the parties collectively receive 11 (55%) to 14 seats (67%). For the presidential election, a candidate needs to win by a simple majority (first-past-the-post). To cast his vote, the voter can make a single mark on the name of a presidential candidate, and in this case the vote is not transmitted to any party list. If the voter marks the symbol of one of the lists, the vote is automatically transferred to the candidate supported by that list. Since the approval of the new regional electoral law in 2018, split voting is not possible, i.e. voting on a list and a candidate who is not supported by it.

The voter can express two preferences, reserving the second to a candidate of a different sex, otherwise the second preferences will not be valid. Among the innovations there is the introduction of gender equality (each party list cannot have more than 60% of candidates of the same sex), and the abolition of the price list and of the split vote.

Campaign
On 20 February 2019, governor Marcello Pittella announced he would not run for a second term and decided to support Carlo Trerotola (PD), the new centre-left candidate. With the retirement of Pittella, the majority of the left-wing Free and Equal (LeU) returned in the centre-left coalition with the list "Progressives for Basilicata". A joint list of left-wing parties ran alone with Valerio Tramutoli as its presidential candidate.

The presidential candidate of the centre-right coalition is Vito Bardi, an independent, former General of Guardia di Finanza, who later joined Silvio Berlusconi's Forza Italia. The presidential candidate of the Five Star Movement (M5S) is Antonio Mattia. The presidential candidate of Lega Sud Ausonia (a regional party who usually run alone) Antonio Postorivo was excluded due to bureaucratic issues.

Parties and candidates

Opinion polls

Results

Results by province

Results by capital city

Seats by province

Voter turnout

Notes

References

Elections in Basilicata
2019 elections in Italy
March 2019 events in Italy